Euphaedra permixtum, the robust Themis forester, is a butterfly in the family Nymphalidae that occurs in forested areas of Nigeria, Cameroon, Gabon, the Democratic Republic of the Congo and possibly Angola.

It is known to consume fallen fruit.

Subspecies
Euphaedra permixtum permixtum (Cameroon, Gabon, Democratic Republic of the Congo: Bas-Zaire, Angola)
Euphaedra permixtum diva Hecq, 1982 (Nigeria: Cross River loop, western Cameroon)

Similar species
Other members of themis species group q.v.

References

Butterflies described in 1873
permixtum
Butterflies of Africa
Taxa named by Arthur Gardiner Butler